Maestrale has been borne by at least two ships of the Italian Navy and may refer to:

 , a  launched in 1934 and scuttled in 1943. Salved and partially repaired by Germany but scuttled again in 1945.
 , a  launched in 1981 and decommissioned in 2015. 

Italian Navy ship names